Halosaurus is a genus of fish in the family Halosauridae.  This genus currently contains the following recognized species:

 Halosaurus attenuatus Garman, 1899 (Galapagos halosaur)
 Halosaurus carinicauda (Alcock, 1889) (Andaman halosaur)
 Halosaurus guentheri Goode & T. H. Bean, 1896 (Guenther's halosaur)
 Halosaurus johnsonianus Vaillant, 1888 (Sahara halosaur)
 †Halosaurus orthensis Nolf 2002
 Halosaurus ovenii J. Y. Johnson, 1864 (Madeira halosaur)
 Halosaurus pectoralis McCulloch, 1926 (Goanna fish)
 Halosaurus radiatus Garman, 1899 (Albatross halosaur)
 Halosaurus ridgwayi (Fowler, 1934) (Ridgeway's halosaur)
 Halosaurus sinensis T. Abe, 1974 (Chinese halosaur)

References 

 

Halosauridae
Deep sea fish
Ray-finned fish genera
Taxa named by James Yate Johnson